Batesimalva is a genus of flowering plants belonging to the family Malvaceae.

Its native range is Texas to Northern Mexico, Venezuela.

Species:

Batesimalva killipii 
Batesimalva lobata 
Batesimalva pulchella 
Batesimalva stipulata 
Batesimalva violacea

References

Malvaceae
Malvaceae genera